Nicoli is a surname. Notable people with the surname include:

Aldo Nicoli (born 1953), Italian footballer and manager
Eric Nicoli (born 1950), British chief executive
Giuseppina Nicoli (1863–1924), Italian nun
Natela Nicoli (born 1961), Georgian opera singer
Nicola de Nicoli, 17th-century Italian painter
Vincenzo Nicoli (born 1958), English actor